Rebate may refer to:

Sales and finance
 Rebate (marketing), a type of sales promotion
 Conditional rebate
 Tax rebate, a reduction in taxation demanded
 UK rebate, a financial mechanism which reduced the United Kingdom's contribution to the European Union

Other uses
 Rebate or rabbet, a woodworking term for a groove
 Rebate plane, a hand plane designed for cutting rabbets in wood
 Rebate tile, a building material used in southeastern England in the 18th and 19th centuries

See also
 Rebate card, a type of debit card
 Kickback (bribery)